The Coxiellaceae are a family in the order Legionellales.

Coxiella burnetii is a species in this order.

Another is Rickettsiella melolonthae.

References

Legionellales
Bacteria families